Pahlavi may refer to:

Iranian royalty
Seven Parthian clans, ruling Parthian families during the Sasanian Empire
Pahlavi dynasty, the ruling house of Imperial State of Persia/Iran from 1925 until 1979
Reza Shah Pahlavi (1878–1944), Shah of Persia from 1925 to 1941
Hamdamsaltaneh Pahlavi (1903–1992), first child and daughter of Reza Shah
Shams Pahlavi (1917–1996), elder sister of Mohammad Reza Pahlavi
Ashraf Pahlavi (1919–2016), twin sister of Mohammad Reza Pahlavi
Mohammad Reza Pahlavi (1919–1980), Shah of Iran from 1941 to 1979
Ali Reza Pahlavi I (1922–1954), brother of Mohammad Reza Pahlavi, second son of Reza Shah
Gholamreza Pahlavi (1923–2017), half-brother of Mohammad Reza Pahlavi, last living child of Reza Shah
Abdul Reza Pahlavi (1924–2004), half-brother of Mohammad Reza Pahlavi
Fatimeh Pahlavi (1928–1987), Reza Shah's tenth child and half-sister of Mohammad Reza Pahlavi.
Hamid Reza Pahlavi (1932–1992), Reza Shah's eleventh and last born child, half-brother of Mohammad Reza Pahlavi.
Farah Pahlavi (born 1938), Shahbanu (Empress) of Iran, widow of Mohammad Reza Pahlavi
Shahnaz Pahlavi (born 1940), first child of Mohammad Reza Pahlavi and Fawzia Fuad Chirine
Patrick Ali Pahlavi (born 1947), nephew of Mohammad Reza Pahlavi, heir presumptive from 1954 to 1960
Reza Pahlavi II (born 1960), Crown Prince of Iran, eldest son of Mohammad Reza Pahlavi
Farahnaz Pahlavi (born 1963), first child of Mohammad Reza Pahlavi and Farah Pahlavi
Ali-Reza Pahlavi (1966–2011), younger son of Mohammad Reza Pahlavi and Farah Pahlavi, second in line to the throne.
Yasmine Pahlavi (born 1968), lawyer and the wife of Reza Pahlavi, the last crown prince of the former Imperial State of Iran
Princess Noor Pahlavi (born 1992), daughter of Reza Pahlavi and Yasmine Pahlavi

Language and writing
 Parthian language or Arsacid Pahlavi, a now-extinct language spoken in Parthia, Iran
 Inscriptional Pahlavi, the earliest attested form of Pahlavi scripts
 Middle Persian, written in the Pahlavi script (including Zoroastrian Middle Persian of the 9th-11th century)
 Pahlavi scripts, as adopted to render various Middle Iranian languages
 Pahlavi literature,  Persian literature of the 1st millennium AD
 Pahlavi Psalter, a 12-page non-contiguous section of a Middle Persian translation of a Syriac book of psalms
 Psalter Pahlavi, a cursive abjad which was used for writing Middle Persian, described as one of the Pahlavi scripts
 Fahlavīyāt or Pahlaviyat, poetry written in dialects of Pahla/Fahla region in western Iran, 9th–18th centuries AD

Places
 Nanur (Pahlavi Dezh), a village in Nanur Rural District, Kurdistan Province, Iran
 Bandar-e Anzali, formerly Pahlavi, a port city in Gilan Province, Iran
 Pahlavi Mordab, a coastal lagoon in the Caspian Sea near Bandar-e Anzali
 Pahlavi Street, former name of Valiasr Street in Tehran, Iran

Other uses
 Order of Pahlavi (Neshan-e Pahlavi), the highest order of the former Imperial State of Iran
 Pahlavi Crown, part of the coronation regalia used by the Pahlavi Shahs and part of the Iranian Crown Jewels
 Pahlavi hat, an item of headgear for men introduced by Reza Shah
 Pahlavi University or Shiraz University,  a public university located in Shiraz, Iran

See also
 
 Ali Reza Pahlavi (disambiguation)
 Pahlavan (disambiguation)
 Pahlavi family tree
 Reza Pahlavi (disambiguation)
 Parthia (disambiguation)
 Parthian (disambiguation)

Iranian-language surnames